72 Model is a 2013 Indian Malayalam-language drama film directed by Rajasenan and starring Govind Padmasoorya and Sreejith Vijay. The film released alongside Akam and August Club. The film's name is based on a 1972 model of an ambassador. The film released to mixed reviews.

Cast 
Govind Padmasoorya as Saajan
Sreejith Vijay as Vivek
Sonia Das as Parvathy
Nazreen Nazar as Janaki
Madhu
Vijayaraghavan as Vasutty
Bharath Chand
Kalabhavan Shajon

Soundtrack 
Music by M. Jayachandran. Lyrics by Rajeev Alunkal and Santhosh Varma. The promotional song "Car Taxi" was sung by Benny Dayal.

Reception
A critic from The Times of India wrote that "Rajasenan dishes out a few moments but they lack the bold, emphatic strokes with which he once wooed viewers". A critic from Nowrunning gave the film a rating of one out of five stars while Indiaglitz gave the film a rating of negative four out of ten. A critic from Filmibeat wrote that "Overall, 72 Model is a good comedy entertainer, which would impress family audience as well as youth". The film was a box office failure.

References

Indian drama films
2013 films
2010s Malayalam-language films
2013 drama films